Adam Dong (born 14 February 1993) is a Chinese-born Canadian badminton player. He won a bronze medal in men's doubles at the 2022 Pan Am Championships.

Early life 
Dong was born in Suzhou, China. Before moving to Canada, he competed in the 2011 National Intercity Games of the People's Republic of China and won a gold in the badminton men's team event representing Nanjing.

Career 
Dong entered the Canadian national team in 2016. On that same year, he partnered with Nyl Yakura. After the duo split up, he formed partnerships with Guoxing Huang and David Wu.

He later partnered with Yakura again in 2021 and they won their first international title together at the Mexican International Series. In 2022, Dong and Yakura won bronze at the 2022 Pan Am Badminton Championships. Dong also represented Canada at the 2022 Thomas & Uber Cup. Dong was also selected to be part of the Canadian contingent competing in the 2022 Commonwealth Games.  Dong and Yakura were also runners-up at the Sydney International in October.

Achievements

Pan Am Championships 
Men's doubles

BWF International Challenge/Series (1 title, 2 runners-up) 
Men's doubles

  BWF International Challenge tournament
  BWF International Series tournament
  BWF Future Series tournament

References

External links 
 

1994 births
Living people
Canadian people of Chinese descent
Canadian male badminton players
Badminton players at the 2022 Commonwealth Games
Commonwealth Games competitors for Canada